William Jervis may refer to:
 William Jervis (cricketer, born 1827) (1827–1909), English lawyer and cricketer
 William Jervis (cricketer, born 1839) (1839–1920), English cricketer 
 Billy Jervis (born 1942), English footballer